Dmitry Olegovich Kramkov is a Russian mathematician at Carnegie Mellon University. His research field are statistics and financial mathematics.

Kramkov obtained his doctorate from Steklov Institute of Mathematics in 1992, under supervision of Albert Shiryaev. In 1996 he was awarded an EMS Prize for his work in filtered statistical experiments.

References

20th-century births
Living people
Moscow Institute of Physics and Technology alumni
Russian mathematicians
Carnegie Mellon University faculty
Soviet mathematicians
Year of birth missing (living people)
Place of birth missing (living people)